Pema Chödrön (པདྨ་ཆོས་སྒྲོན། padma chos sgron “lotus dharma lamp”; born Deirdre Blomfield-Brown, July 14, 1936) is an American Tibetan-Buddhist.  She is an ordained nun, former acharya of Shambhala Buddhism and disciple of Chögyam Trungpa Rinpoche. Chödrön has written several dozen books and audiobooks, and is principal teacher at Gampo Abbey in Nova Scotia.

Early life and education
Chödrön was born Deirdre Blomfield-Brown in 1936 in New York City. She grew up Catholic. She attended Miss Porter's School in Farmington, Connecticut, and grew up on a New Jersey farm with an older brother and sister. She obtained a bachelor's degree in English literature from Sarah Lawrence College and a master's degree in elementary education from the University of California, Berkeley.

Career
 
Chödrön began studying with Lama Chime Rinpoche during frequent trips to London over a period of several years. While in the United States she studied with Trungpa Rinpoche in San Francisco. In 1974, she became a novice Buddhist nun under Rangjung Rigpe Dorje, the sixteenth Gyalwa Karmapa. In Hong Kong in 1981 she became the first American in the Vajrayana tradition to become a fully ordained nun or bhikṣuṇī.

Trungpa appointed Chödrön director of the Boulder Shambhala Center (Boulder Dharmadhatu) in Colorado in the early 1980s. Chödrön moved to Gampo Abbey in 1984,  the first Tibetan Buddhist monastery in North America for Western men and women, and became its first director in 1986. Chödrön's first book, The Wisdom of No Escape, was published in 1991.  Then, in 1993, she was given the title of acharya when Trungpa's son, Sakyong Mipham Rinpoche, assumed leadership of his father's Shambhala lineage.

In 1994, she became ill with chronic fatigue syndrome, but gradually her health improved. During this period, she met Dzigar Kongtrul Rinpoche and took him as her teacher. That year she published her second book, Start Where You Are and in 1996, When Things Fall Apart.  No Time to Lose, a commentary on Shantideva's Guide to the Bodhisattva's Way of Life, was published in 2005. That year, Chödrön became a member of The Committee of Western Bhikshunis.  Practicing Peace in Times of War came out in 2007. In 2016 she was awarded the Global Bhikkhuni Award, presented by the Chinese Buddhist Bhikkhuni Association of Taiwan. In 2020 she retired from her acharya role from Shambhala International, in part due to the group's handling of sexual misconduct allegations, saying, "I do not feel that I can continue any longer as a representative and senior teacher of Shambhala given the unwise direction in which I feel we are going."

Teaching
Chödrön teaches the traditional "Yarne" retreat at Gampo Abbey each winter and the Guide to the Bodhisattva's Way of Life in Berkeley each summer. A central theme of her teaching is the principle of "shenpa", or "attachment", which she interprets as the moment one is hooked into a cycle of habitual negative or self-destructive thoughts and actions. According to Chödrön, this occurs when something in the present stimulates a reaction to a past experience.

Personal life
Chödrön married at age 21 and had two children but was divorced in her mid-twenties. She remarried and then divorced a second time eight years later. She has three grandchildren, all of whom reside in the San Francisco Bay Area.

Bibliography

References

External links

Profile at the Pema Chödrön Foundation

1936 births
Living people
20th-century lamas
20th-century American philosophers
American Buddhist nuns
American spiritual writers
Buddhist nuns
American scholars of Buddhism
Tibetan Buddhism writers
Converts to Buddhism from Roman Catholicism
American Buddhists
American former Christians
People with chronic fatigue syndrome
Tibetan Buddhists from the United States
Tibetan Buddhist spiritual teachers
UC Berkeley Graduate School of Education alumni
American women philosophers
Writers from New York City
Miss Porter's School alumni
20th-century American women writers
Buddhist acharyas
American women non-fiction writers
20th-century American non-fiction writers
20th-century Buddhist nuns
21st-century Buddhist nuns
Sarah Lawrence College alumni
21st-century American women